Marco Sailer (16 November 1985 in Schwäbisch Hall) is a German footballer who currently plays for FSV Wacker 90 Nordhausen.

Career
Sailer learned his football at local club TSV Bitzfeld. Whilst still a teenager, he joined VfR Heilbronn. In 2004, he moved to VfR Aalen. In 2008, he celebrated promotion to the newly formed 3. Liga with the club. He scored the club's first goal in the new league on 26 July 2008 in a 2–1 victory. That season, Aalen were relegated to Regionalliga Süd and Sailer was released. He then joined SpVgg Greuther Fürth and signed a two-year contract. After only one year, he left to join 3. Liga side SV Wehen Wiesbaden, and eighteen months later he moved on again, to 1. FC Heidenheim. After only 18 months at Heidenheim, Sailer joined SV Darmstadt 98 with whom he managed to get, through two successive promotions, into the Bundesliga. In 2016 Sailer moved to Regionalliga Nordost side FSV Wacker 90 Nordhausen.

References

External links
 

1985 births
German footballers
Living people
SpVgg Greuther Fürth players
VfR Aalen players
SV Wehen Wiesbaden players
1. FC Heidenheim players
SV Darmstadt 98 players
Bundesliga players
2. Bundesliga players
3. Liga players
Regionalliga players
Association football forwards
People from Schwäbisch Hall
Sportspeople from Stuttgart (region)
Footballers from Baden-Württemberg